Olallie Lake may refer to:

 Olallie Scenic Area which contains Olallie Lake, in Oregon
 Olallie Lake Guard Station within the Olallie Scenic Area
 Olallie Lake in Skamania County, Washington
 Olallie Lake in the Alpine Lakes Wilderness in Washington